Robert McDermid was a Scottish professional footballer who played as a full back.

McDermid played in Lincoln City's last two matches of their opening Football League campaign before moving back to Scotland and eventually playing for Newcastle United.

References

Scottish footballers
Association football defenders
Lincoln City F.C. players
English Football League players
Scottish Football League players
Year of death missing
Year of birth missing
Newcastle United F.C. players
Stockton F.C. players
Renton F.C. players
Dundee Wanderers F.C. players
Burton Swifts F.C. players
Accrington F.C. players